The 2019 Americas Rallycross Championship was the second and final season of the Americas Rallycross Championship, a feeder championship to the FIA World Rallycross Championship representing North America. The season consists of six rounds across two categories; Supercar and ARX2. The season commenced on 8 June at the Mid-Ohio Sports Car Course in Lexington, Ohio and finished on the 6 October at the same location.

The series folded after the 2019 season.

Calendar
The calendar was unveiled on 31 January 2019.

Calendar changes
 The calendar was expanded from four rounds to six, with the inclusion of two rounds at Mid-Ohio and a double-header at Gateway.
 The round supporting the World RX of Great Britain was dropped.
 The ARX of COTA was rebranded as the ARX of Austin and was moved from July to September to replace the cancelled FIA World Rallycross Championship round.
 The ARX of Canada will run in conjunction with FIA World Rallycross Championship once again.

Entries

Supercar

ARX2

ARX3

Driver Changes
 Scott Speed moved from Volkswagen Andretti Rallycross to Subaru Rally Team USA
 Cabot Bigham moved from Dreyer & Reinbold Racing in ARX2 to Volkswagen Andretti Rallycross to replace Speed.
 Steve Arpin left Hoonigan Racing Division to start his own team, Loenbro Motorsports.
 Travis PeCoy moved from Dreyer & Reinbold Racing in ARX2 to Loenbro Motorsports.

Results and standings
Championship points are scored as follows:

 A red background denotes drivers who did not advance from the round

Supercar

ARX2

ARX3

References

External links 
 Official website 

Americas Rallycross Championship
2019 in World Rallycross